Bhai Gurdas Institute of Engineering & Technology (BGIET) is a college in Sangrur, Punjab, India. The college offers B.Tech, M.Tech, MBA, MCA, BBA, BCA, B.Com.

Departments
 Engineering
 Polytechnic
 Management
 Nursing

Rankings

1. BGIET is an NBA Accredited Institute.

2. BGIET is ranked among the TOP 5 Engineering Institutes of Punjab in terms of infrastructural & Pedagogic systems.

3. BGIET is ranked among the TOP 3 Institutions of PTU in terms of placements.

4. BGIET is ranked among the best B-Schools of India 'Business India B-Schools Survey 2013'.

5. BGIET is rated A+ in All India Rating Category among B-Schools (Indian Management 2013).

Courses offered
B.Tech [Electronics & Communication Engineering] seats- 120
B.Tech [Computer Science and Engineering] seats-120
B.Tech [Information Technology] seats-60
B.Tech [Mechanical Engineering] seats-120
B.Tech [Electrical Engineering] seats-60
B.Tech. [Civil Engineering] seats-60
B.Tech [Food Technology] seats-30
M. Tech. [Electronics & Communication Engineering] seats-24
M. Tech. [Electrical Engineering seats-18
M. Tech. [Mechanical Engineering] seats-18
M. Tech. [Computer Science and Engineering] seats-24

External links

References 

Engineering colleges in Punjab, India
2003 establishments in Punjab, India
Educational institutions established in 2003